Kim Harbort (born 4 September 1987) is an Australian handball player for Northern Panthers and the Australian national team.

References

1987 births
Living people
Australian female handball players